Parliamentary elections were held in Azerbaijan on 12 November 1995, with a second round on 26 November. However, the results in 15 constituencies were declared invalid due to fraud, with fresh elections held on 4 February 1996.

The final result was a victory for the New Azerbaijan Party, which won 53 of the 125 seats in the National Assembly. Voter turnout was 86.1%.

Results

References

Parliamentary elections in Azerbaijan
Azerbaijan
Azerbaijan
Parliamentary
Parliamentary
Election and referendum articles with incomplete results